Señorita República Dominicana 1973 was held on January 29, 1973. There were 28 candidates who competed for the national crown. The winner represented the Dominican Republic at the Miss Universe 1973. The Virreina al Miss Mundo entered Miss World 1973. Only 27 provinces and 1 municipality entered. The top 10 contestants paraded in evening gowns and answered questions to select the top five, who then answered more questions.

Results

Señorita República Dominicana 1973 : Liliana Maritza Fernández González (Salcedo)
Virreina al Miss Mundo : Clariza Ana Duarte Garrido (Puerto Plata)
1st Runner Up : Nidez Veras (Espaillat)
2nd Runner Up : Ana Hidalgo (Barahona)
3rd Runner Up : Rita Hernández (Distrito Nacional)

Top 10

Julia Wilton (Santiago)
Silvana Rodríguez (Santo Domingo de Guzmán)
Rocio Vargas (Valverde)
Wilma Suarez (La Vega)
Ynes Delgado (Azua)

Special awards
 Miss Rostro Bello – Silvana Rodríguez (Puerto Plata)
 Miss Photogenic (voted by press reporters) - Erica Taxción (Séibo) 
 Miss Congeniality (voted by Miss Dominican Republic Universe contestants) - Yolanda Romero (Peravia)
 Best Provincial Costume - María Ruiz (Samaná)

Delegates

 Azua - María Ynes Delgado Coruña
 Baoruco - Ana Carina Frustrado Duarte
 Barahona - Ana María Hidalgo Peña
 Dajabón - Linda Viviana Sánchez Brito
 Distrito Nacional - Rita Carmen Hernández de las Palmas
 Duarte - Sarah Ceneyda del Rosario Cruz
 Espaillat - Nidez Magdalena Veras Duarte
 Independencia - Janet Ann Luzio Peralta
 La Altagracia - Aida Magia del Rey Tavarez
 La Estrelleta - Gladys Zamia Colón Reyes
 La Romana - Vanessa María Díaz Lovo
 La Vega - Magdalena Wilma Suarez Cristiano
 María Trinidad Sánchez - Eugenia Xiomara Ramírez Caba
 Monte Cristi - Fernanda Germania de Cristo Valle
 Pedernales - María José Ocoa Espinal
 Peravia - Yolanda Carina Romero Castro
 Puerto Plata - Clariza Ana Duarte Garrido
 Salcedo - Liliana Maritza Fernández González
 Samaná -  María Jesus Ruiz Castaño
 Sánchez Ramírez - Eva Miranda Mérida Sosa
 San Cristóbal -  Ana Jiomara Taitis Hello
 San Juan de la Maguana - Medrina Anes Maldonado Ruz
 San Pedro - Ana María Sosa Sosa
 Santiago - Julia Margarita Wilton de los Rosarios
 Santiago Rodríguez - María Lucia García Rosario
 Séibo - Erica Mariana Taxción Olivio
 Santo Domingo de Guzmán - Silvana Teresa Rodríguez de los Víllas
 Valverde - Rocio Fernanda Vargas Lozano

Miss Dominican Republic
1973 beauty pageants
1973 in the Dominican Republic